Totnes Trinitarian Priory, also known as the Trinitarian hospital of Warland was a medieval monastic house in the town of Totnes in Devon, England. It was founded in 1271, and dissolved in 1509.

Parts of the priory's chapel still remain as ruins.

References

Monasteries in Devon
1271 establishments
1509 disestablishments